678 Fredegundis is a minor planet orbiting the Sun. It was discovered 22 January 1909 from Heidelberg by German astronomer K. Wilhelm Lorenz, and was named after the French opera Frédégonde. The orbital plane is inclined at an angle of 6.1° to the plane of the ecliptic

This appears to be an M-type asteroid in the Tholen classification and X-type in the Bus and Binzel system. It spans a girth of approximately 42 km and is spinning with a rotation period of 11.6201 hours. Radar observations suggest a bifurcated structure consistent with a contact binary.

References

External links 
 Lightcurve plot of 678 Fredegundis, Palmer Divide Observatory, B. D. Warner (2008)
 Asteroid Lightcurve Database (LCDB), query form (info )
 Dictionary of Minor Planet Names, Google books
 Asteroids and comets rotation curves, CdR – Observatoire de Genève, Raoul Behrend
 Discovery Circumstances: Numbered Minor Planets (1)-(5000) – Minor Planet Center
 
 

Background asteroids
Fredegundis
Fredegundis
X-type asteroids (SMASS)
19090122